Dream Corp LLC is an American black comedy television series created by Daniel Stessen for Adult Swim. Dream Corp LLC is an absurdist workplace comedy set in a run-down dream therapy facility located in a dilapidated strip mall. In each episode, a new desperate patient has their dreams recorded, analyzed, and, if necessary, adjusted, by Dr. Roberts (Jon Gries) and his staff of misfits.

The series is the first on Adult Swim to use rotoscoping. It premiered on October 23, 2016.

On July 15, 2022, actor Jon Gries confirmed the series was cancelled after three seasons and it was sold to Hulu. Preliminary discussions about a revival have occurred.

Plot
Dream Corp LLC is set in a run-down dream therapy facility located in a derelict strip mall which "operates on the fringes of medical science and legality". Desperate patients – all of them referred to only by number – have their dreams recorded and analyzed by Dr. Roberts and his staff. Roberts uses an unconventional method: he inserts himself into those surreal dreams to guide the patient to overcoming their problem, all while being watched and monitored by his colleagues, including the claw-handed technician Randy; Ahmed, a dope-smoking nurse; the sardonic robot T.E.R.R.Y.; Roberts' female psychology assistant (who changes every season); and a patient, 88, who has been co-opted to work for Roberts as part of his therapy, because he could not pay for it.

Cast
 Jon Gries as Dr. Roberts
 Nick Rutherford as Patient 88
 Ahmed Bharoocha as Ahmed
 Mark Proksch as Randy Blink
 Stephen Merchant as T.E.R.R.Y.
 Stephanie Allynne as Joey (season 1)
 Megan Ferguson as Bea (season 2)
 Sunita Mani as Margot Daly (season 3)

Production
Dream Corp LLC is a black comedy created by Daniel Stessen, known for co-writing and directing The Gold Sparrow, an animated short film released in 2013. Adult Swim commissioned a pilot based on Stessen's original idea for the series in May 2014, ahead of the network's upfront advertising meeting. The pilot featured guest stars Bud Cort, Baron Vaughn, and Moises Arias. The series is produced by Williams Street. Dream Corp LLC was ordered for a full season in November 2015, and the network made mention of the series in their 2016 upfront.

The series is the first on Adult Swim to use rotoscoping to achieve animation; this technique entails drawing over live-action footage. This process was used for Stessen's short film The Gold Sparrow and the pilot for Dream Corp LLC. Reclusive animator and songwriter Chad VanGaalen was brought on board to provide musical score for the show and also designed "T.E.R.R.Y." the office robot. The trailer for the series was released on October 5, 2016.

The series' animated segments are handled by two companies. BEMO provides the visual effects and CG graphics, while Artbelly Productions provides the rotoscoped character animation using their proprietary rotoscoping software, Rotobelly. The live action portions of the show were produced by Caviar Content in season one, with Alive and Kicking, Inc. taking over live action shoots in season two.

Season 2 premiered on October 21, 2018.

A "sneak preview" of season 3 premiered as part of Adult Swim's annual April Fool's programming stunt. It was expected to premiere in Summer 2020, but a late June 2020 launch date was pushed back. On October 12, 2020, it was announced that the third season would premiere on October 25, 2020.

On July 15, 2022, actor Jon Gries confirmed the series was cancelled after three seasons and it was sold to Hulu. A revival is currently in the works.

Style
The visual style of Dream Corp LLC has been described as "the degraded, retro-futurist look of Terry Gilliam’s Brazil and the underrated The Zero Theorem, while the sci-fi exists in the realm of lo-fi realism like Charlie Kaufman and Michel Gondry’s Eternal Sunshine of the Spotless Mind." The original Artbelly rotoscopers worked on the films Waking Life (2001) and A Scanner Darkly (2006), the look of which also contributes to the show's aesthetic.

Episodes

Season 1 (2016)

Season 2 (2018)

Season 3 (2020)

References
Informational notes

Citations

External links
 

2016 American television series debuts
2020 American television series endings
2010s American black comedy television series
2020s American black comedy television series
2010s American workplace comedy television series
2020s American workplace comedy television series
American adult animated comedy television series
English-language television shows
Adult Swim original programming
Television series by Williams Street
Television shows about dreams
Works set in psychiatric hospitals
American television shows featuring puppetry
American television series with live action and animation